Heidi Pechstein (later Kunze, born 4 July 1944 in Leipzig) is a German former swimmer. She competed in the 1960 and 1964 Summer Olympics and won a bronze medal in the 4 × 100 m freestyle relay in 1960. In 1964 she finished sixth with the German team in the same event.

At the 1962 European Aquatics Championships, she won a gold medal in the 4 × 100 m medley relay, setting the new world record. For this achievement, the relay team members were named German Sportspersonalities of the Year in the team category in 1962. Individually, Pechstein won a gold medal in the 100 m freestyle at the same championships and a silver medal in the 400 m medley four years later.

References

1944 births
Living people
German female freestyle swimmers
Olympic swimmers of the United Team of Germany
Swimmers at the 1960 Summer Olympics
Swimmers at the 1964 Summer Olympics
Olympic bronze medalists for the United Team of Germany
Olympic bronze medalists in swimming
Swimmers from Leipzig
European Aquatics Championships medalists in swimming
Medalists at the 1960 Summer Olympics